Dominic College is a Roman Catholic, co-educational, day school, located in Glenorchy, a suburb of , Tasmania, Australia.

Dominic College caters for students from Kindergarten to Grade 10.

History

The college owes its religious foundation to the Salesians of Don Bosco and the Dominican Sisters. Dominic College was formed in 1973 and was the first Co-educational Catholic College in Tasmania. The Senior Campus amalgamated with other Catholic Secondary Colleges in 1995 to form Guilford Young College. In 2009, Dominic opened an on-campus early learning and child care centre.

Student leadership 

The four houses of the college, Bosco, Siena, Savio and Guzman, have four leaders each which all have set responsibilities.
Mission Captains: Enforces the religious and community aspect of school life by helping in masses, liturgies and charity.
Sport Captains: Enforces the sporting aspect of school life by assisting in organising sporting carnivals, lunchtime sport and co-curricular sport.
Creative Arts Captains: Enforces the creative arts aspect of school life by assisting and promoting house events such as house drama, co-curricular creative arts and various public exhibitions.
Academic Captains: Promote the importance of learning throughout the college by ensuring all students are learning to the best of their abilities.
These leaders are also assisted by their house co-ordinator.
The secondary college and primary school also has one male and female captain and one male and female vice-captain. These captaincy positions are held by students in either year 6 or year 10. The captains must uphold the school values and represent the school wherever they are.
Each leader of any sort receives a black tie and badge for recognition towards their position in the school.

House system 

All students and staff are assigned to a particular House and family links are observed for the sake of tradition and continuity. The House system operates in Kindergarten – Year 10. Each student belongs to one of the following Houses under the direction of the House Coordinator:
BOSCO (Blue): Eagles
GUZMAN (Green): Crocodiles
SAVIO (Yellow): Sharks
SIENA (Red): Dragons

Students are divided evenly among the houses. Houses are allocated evenly to each of the primary classes and for Year 7–10 students, pastoral/home groups are assigned to a particular house.
Dominic College actively participates in several house carnivals and events. Traditional house carnivals include Cross Country, Athletics and Swimming Carnivals. While many schools have had to do away with these carnivals due to poor attendance records, Dominic enjoys increased attendance for such events due to the strength of the vertically streamed pastoral groups and the camaraderie which they encourage. More recently introduced house events include House Drama and House Dance.
and sex education

Sport 
Dominic College is a member of the Sports Association of Tasmanian Independent Schools (SATIS).

SATIS premierships 
Dominic College has won the following SATIS premierships.

Boys:

 Football - 1977
 Hockey - 1982
 Rowing Eight - 1988
 Tennis (2) - 1980, 1982

Girls:

 Netball (4) - 1985, 1988, 1990, 1994
 Softball (2) - 1980, 1984
 Tennis - 1982

Notable alumni
 Luke McGregor - comedian and actor
 David Walsh – professional gambler, businessman, art collector, owner of the Museum of Old and New Art (MONA)
 James Manson - AFL Footballer 
 Ian Stewart - footballer, Richmond Football Club, St Kilda Football Club
 Paul Williams - AFL footballer
 Andy Lovell- AFL Footballer, Melbourne Football Club
 Liam Jones, AFL Footballer, Western Bulldogs Football Club, Carlton Football Club

See also

 List of schools in Tasmania
 Education in Tasmania
 Roman Catholic Archdiocese of Hobart
 Catholic education in Australia

References

External links 
 Dominic College website

Catholic primary schools in Hobart
Catholic secondary schools in Hobart
Educational institutions established in 1973
Junior School Heads Association of Australia Member Schools
1973 establishments in Australia
Glenorchy, Tasmania